
Lautaro was a 16th-century indigenous leader in what is now Chile.

It may also refer to:

Persons
Lautaro Acosta, Argentine footballer
Lautaro Baeza, Argentine–Chilean footballer
Lautaro Chávez, Argentine footballer
Lautaro Delgado, Argentine film and TV actor
Lautaro Martínez, Argentine footballer
Lautaro Murúa, Chilean–Argentine film and TV actor
Lautaro Núñez Atencio, Chilean historian
Lautaro Palacios, Argentine footballer
Lautaro Parisi, Argentine footballer
Lautaro Schinnea, Argentine footballer

Institutions
Lautaro Lodge, a lodge created by Francisco de Miranda to promote the emancipation of the South American colonies
Lautaro de Buin, a Chilean football club

Places
Lautaro, Chile, a town and municipality in southern Chile's Araucanía Region
Lautaro (volcano), a volcano in the Southern Patagonian Ice Fields, Chile
Lautaro Island, an island in the west of Lemaire Island in Gerlache Strait, Antarctic Peninsula

Ships
 There are eight ships of the Chilean Navy named Lautaro: see Chilean ship Lautaro

Masculine given names
Mapuche given names
Spanish masculine given names